The following is an incomplete list of German colonel generals.

Generals later promoted to general field marshal (GFM) are not included.

German Empire

German Army
See also:
⇒ de: List of the German Empire's colonel generals

 Insignias

Weimar Republic

Reichswehr

1926 – Hans von Seeckt (1866–1936), Chef of the Oberste Heeresleitung
1930 – Wilhelm Heye (1869–1946), Chef of the Oberste Heeresleitung
1934 – Kurt Freiherr von Hammerstein-Equord (1878–1943), Chef of the Oberste Heeresleitung

Third Reich

Heer
See also:
⇒ World War II German Army ranks and insignia

 Insignias

Luftwaffe
⇒ See also: Military Ranks of the Luftwaffe (1935–1945)

 Insignias

SS

SS Oberst-Gruppenführer and Generaloberst of the Waffen-SS:

 Insignias

 1942 - Paul Hausser (1880–1972)
 1944 - Sepp Dietrich (1892–1966)

SS Oberst-Gruppenführer and Generaloberst of the Police:

 Insignias

 1942 - Kurt Daluege (1897-1946)

German Democratic Republic (GDR)

National People's Army
⇒ See also: Rank insignias

 Insignias

Ministerium für Staatssicherheit (MfS)
 Bruno Beater (1914–1982)
 Rudi Mittig (1925–1994)
 Markus Wolf (1923–2006)

German Volkspolizei (DVP)
 Karl Maron (1903–1975)
 Karl-Heinz Wagner

See also
 Comparative officer ranks of World War I
Comparative officer ranks of World War II
 List of Austro-Hungarian colonel generals
 List of Generalobersts

German generals
German generals
Generals
Gen
Colonel generals